Dayar-e-Dil (English: The Valley of Heart) is a novella by Pakistani fiction writer Farhat Ishtiaq, published in 2010.

Dayar-e-Dil was first published in Shuaa Digest as a story in its complete novel section, followed by Mere Humdum Mere Dost. In 2010, both stories was compiled in a book of the same name of a former story (English: My life partner, My friend) by Ilm-o-Irfan publications.

Plot summary

Faarah is a young doctor who is currently doing her house job. Her mother Ruhina left to Karachi after their dispute over the property, which Ruhina is demanding from her Father in law in respect to the divorce of Farah and Wali. Where Farah is reluctant on taking property. For fifteen days, she spare herself from the outer world, when one day Wali calls her and tell her that he is agree to give her divorce including whatever else she wants and they decided to meet. Farah then meets Wali, who propose a contract and ask if She is agree to live in Peshawar with Agha Jan for three months, he will give her divorce including the property she is demanding and whatever else she wants. Despite being alarmed she reluctantly agrees and signed a contract, without telling anyone she and Wali left for Peshawar, where ailing Agha Jaan became energetic after seeing her. 
Not able to understand, she concludes that Wali brought her here because of the declining health of her Grandfather. However, she decided to fulfill the contract, but gradually she went through many truths, about their lives and families. After meeting with Agha Jan, Farah went to rest in her Fathers room, where she remembers all the past events that occurs.

In the past, it is then revealed that, Bakhtiyar Khan is a landlord and had two sons Behroze and Suhaib. Behroze is engaged to his uncles daughter Amina from childhood, and both are meant to married at proper age. But, things changes when Behroze refuses to marry his cousin, because he loves Ruhina, his classmate. Agha Jan furiously rejects his proposal and orders him to leave the house. Agha Jaan decided that Suhaib will marry to his niece, unable to resist Suhaib agrees. After that, Behorze marries Ruhina, and both have daughter Faarah, while Suhaib has two children Wali and Zarmeen. Suhaib tries every way to reunite Behroze with family, but all went in vain. Suhaib wanted her son Wali to marry Behorze daughter's Faarah in order to reunite the family. After 18 years, Behroze gets the news of his Brother death, he decided to go back to Peshawar and agree to fulfill his brother last wish, Ruhina oppose the decision as both are children's and two have dispute for the first time in life, despite Ruhina reservation Faarah gets marry to Wali, they went back to Lahore in order to come back forever, Ruhina left and went to his brother’s house, all in sudden Behorze dies. This shocked Ruhina too much that his sorrow becomes hate for Agha Jaan, she instantly ask for divorce and demands property for Farah. However, Agha Jaan refuse this and decided that Faarah should continue her studies as her father’s wish was to make her doctor. Ruhina finds every way to blame Faarah and Agha Jaan for spoiling her life, due to continue depression and Ruhina's behavior Faarah started to blame Wali and hates her as she thinks he is not ready to give her divorce. Agha Jaan tries to reconnect with them and ask for Rukhsati, but Ruhina demand divorce which Faarah also wants but when Ruhina ask for property on the suggestion of her brother and niece, Faarah became angry as she doesn't want any property. Faarah herself ask for divorce in front of Agha Jaan and Wali, which chokes Agha Jaan, unbearable to this confession Agha Jaan had a heart attack for the second time, which makes him more ill and lean. Ruhina who thinks that her daughter is not taking her side, leaves her and went to Canada to her sister.

Back at present, Agha Jaan told her how he loves her and he is shameful for not accepting Ruhina’s as her daughter in law and now wants to make everything right. Faarah continue to develop soft corner and affection for Agha Jan as she realizes that he is a changed man and whatever her mother think is not right. She tries to contact with her mother but she refuse to talk to her. Zarmeen who is taking care of Agha Jan also hates Faarah as she thinks that because of her Agha Jaan has to bear all the problems, she remains restraint from her. One day Agha Jaan took her to a newly built portion of house where he reveals that he made this for them, Agha Jaan then tearfully confess his mistakes and apologize to Faarah for creating stir in their life, this depression gives Agha Jan another heart attack, she ran for help, Wali, Zarmeen tries to revive Agha Jaan, but he remains unresponded. Zarmeen yelled at Faarah and blames her for Agha Jaan's condition. Faarah insist to stay with Agha Jaan, she witness Wali praying and crying and for the first time she pay attention on him, she sat down near him in the corridor and started crying for her misbehavior and all the problems that she has created. Faarah decided to make amends and reunite with her whole heart, she patch up with Zermeen and develop a strong love for Wali, meanwhile she destroys the contract.

Faarah calls her mother for one last time, she told her how they were wrong about their family, how her father died, how things could have been and makes her realize that they both did mistake in understanding Agha Jaan and Wali. Few days later, Moeez came to Peshawar and ask her to come back, as he thinks that Wali is forcing her to stay. But she refuses to go with him and ask that she was wrong about her grandfather and Wali, and tells him that she will continue her marriage with Wali, with her will. She apologize to Wali and ask him that it was not her who was demanding the property and now she doesn't want divorce as Agh Jaan will not bear another stress, But Wali explains her that Agha Jaan has already said that it is up to her whatever decision she will made, it will be accepted. He also said that he wants to marry a girl who loves him and wants to stay with him, not because of someone else happiness but her own. He tells her that he didn't hate her or considered responsible for all this, but blames her that she didn't know what actually she wants. Meanwhile Ruhina, realizes her mistake and calls Agha Jaan and tearfully confess her mistakes and promise Agha Jan to come to him forever. Faarah's anxiousness increases as three months has come to an end, on the last day she went to her portion and sat there for a long time and cries as she thinks that he doesn't love her. While coming back to her room she mistakenly went to Wali's room and sleeps there. In the morning Wali wakes her up, and gives her some paper which she angrily tore, and tell him that she doesn't want divorce, she wanted to stay with him because she love's him. Wali then reveals that he already knows that she was in love with him, he just wanted to confess from her mouth, he also confess her that once he hates her but now he has also fallen in love with her.

Publication
Dayar-e-Dil was first published in "Shuaa Digest" as a story in "complete Novel" section, followed by Mere Humdam Mere Dost. In 2010, both stories was compiled in a book of the same name of a former story (English: My life partner, My friend) by Ilm-o-Irfan publications.

Television adaptation

In 2015, a television adaptation was made by Hum TV in collaboration with channels own production house MD Productions.  It stars Mikaal Zulfiqar as Behroze, Sanam Saeed as Ruhina, Maya Ali as Farah, Osman Khalid Butt as Wali, Ali Rehman Khan as Suhaib and Abid Ali as Agha Jan.

References

External links
 Dayar-e-Dil

Urdu-language fiction
Urdu-language novels
Pakistani romance novels
Pakistani novels